The 2017 PLA Day parade was a military parade at Zhurihe Training Base in Inner Mongolia, on 1 August 2017 to celebrate the 90th anniversary of founding of the People's Liberation Army (PLA) and the Nanchang uprising that caused its founding. The parade was the first one to be held outside of Beijing since 1981 and the only one to date to only include military equipment and no marchpast. It also was the first organized event to be held on 1 August, which is PLA Day in China. Central Military Commission (CMC) Chairman and Party General Secretary Xi Jinping inspected the troops while CMC vice chairman Fan Changlong was the parade's master of ceremonies and General Han Weiguo of the Central Theater Command was parade commander. 12,000 troops participated in the parade dressed up in combat garb instead of the usual Type 07 full dress uniform. According to the Minister of National Defense, this was done to replicate troops in a "dust-covered battlefield atmosphere".

A key cause for controversy was the fact that during the parade when the CPC Flag was paraded ahead of the Flag of China. Voice of America pointed out that this violated Article 15 of the Law of the Flag of China. Network commentators in China saw this an inappropriate move.

References

External links 
China holds military parade to mark PLA 90th birthday 庆祝中国人民解放军建军90周年阅兵
Full video: China’s grand military parade marks PLA 90th birthday | 中国人民解放军建军90周年阅兵

Military parades in China
2017 in China
Military history of the People's Republic of China
2017 in military history
August 2017 events in China